Zhengxiang Subdistrict is a subdistrict and the seat of Zhengxiang District in Hengyang, Hunan, China. The subdistrict of Zhengxiang has three villages and 13 communities under its jurisdiction, its administration office is at Taiping Residential Area.

History
The subdistrict of Zhengxiang was formed as a division of the former Chengbei District in May 1978; it had 17 communities of Hengqi, Hengshao, Lianhecun, Lianhe Xincun, Taiping I, Taiping II, Taiping III, Taiping IV, Dayuantou, Yanghuiqiao, Jiefangxilu, Xueyuanlu, Xueyuan Xicun, Honghu, Honghutang, Yejin and Yixueyuan under its jurisdiction.

Before the urban district adjustment of Hengyang in June 2001, the subdistrict of Zhengxiang governed 19 communities. After adjustment of the urban divisions, Chengbei District was dissolved and Zhengxiang Subdistrict was placed under the jurisdiction of Zhengxiang District. The subdistrict administered 10 of the original 19 communities, and the remaining nine communities were respectively assigned to Hongxiang Subdistrict, Lianhe Subdistrict and Changhu Township.

Through the amalgamation of village-level divisions in 2016, its division was reduced to 16 from 17.

Subdivisions
The newly established subdistrict of Zhengxiang administered four villages and 13 communities in 2015. Through the amalgamation of village-level divisions in 2016, its division was reduced to 16 from 17, the subdistrict has three villages and 13 communities under its jurisdiction.

13 communities
 Dayuantou Community
 Hengshao Community
 Honghu Community
 Liaojiawan Community
 First Community of Lixin Residential Area
 Second Community of Lixin Residential Area
 Pinghu Community
 Shijicheng Community
 First Community of Taiping Residential Area
 Second Community of Taiping Residential Area
 Wenjiatai Community
 Xiaojiawan Community
 Yanghuiqiao Community

3 villages
 Changhu Village
 Dali Village
 Songting Village

References

'

Hengyang
Subdistricts of Hunan